Bolesław Grzegorz Piecha (born 19 September 1954 in Rybnik) is a Polish politician. He was elected to Sejm on 25 September 2005, getting 23887 votes in 30 Rybnik district as a candidate from Law and Justice list. He was vice-minister of health.

He was also a member of Sejm 2001-2005. Test

On occasion of limiting access of children to hospices, Piecha is known to explain "Children [under palliative care - ed.] with non-oncological diseases are not going to die within a reasonable period of time [!!!-ed.]. They will live for many years and require palliative care." 

Piecha is a Member of the European Parliament (MEP) since 2014.

See also
Members of Polish Sejm 2005-2007

External links
Bolesław Grzegorz Piecha - parliamentary page - includes declarations of interest, voting record, and transcripts of speeches.

1954 births
Living people
People from Rybnik
Polish women physicians
Members of the Polish Sejm 2001–2005
Members of the Polish Sejm 2005–2007
Members of the Polish Sejm 2007–2011
Members of the Polish Sejm 2019–2023
Law and Justice MEPs
MEPs for Poland 2014–2019